is a JR East railway station on the Hanawa Line in the city of Hachimantai, Iwate Prefecture, Japan.

Lines

Station layout
Koyanohata Station has one ground-level side platform serving a single bi-directional track. There is a rain shelter on the platform, but no station building. The station is unattended.

History
Koyanohata Station opened on December 1, 1960, serving the town of Ashiro. The station was absorbed into the JR East network upon the privatization of JNR on April 1, 1987.

Surrounding area
National Route 282

See also
 List of Railway Stations in Japan

References

External links

  

Hanawa Line
Railway stations in Japan opened in 1960
Railway stations in Iwate Prefecture
Stations of East Japan Railway Company
Hachimantai, Iwate